Jo Swinson was elected to lead the Liberal Democrats on 22 July 2019. However, she resigned the leadership following the loss of her seat in the 2019 General Election. Swinson was the first woman to lead the party, and also the youngest person to do so. The list that follows is the frontbench team led by Swinson in 2019.

Swinson announced her first frontbench team in August 2019. Of 14 MPs, Norman Lamb and Sarah Wollaston were not included in the shadow cabinet given their roles as Chair of respective Select Committees.

Liberal Democrat Frontbench Team (2019)

See also
Cabinet of the United Kingdom
Official Opposition Shadow Cabinet (UK)

References

External links
 Liberal Democrats: Shadow Cabinet

Politics of the United Kingdom
Liberal Democrats (UK) frontbench team
Frontbench Team of Jo Swinson